Bita may refer to :

Places and jurisdictions
 Bita (Africa), an Ancient city, former bishopric and Latin Catholic titular see in Roman North Africa 
 an Archaic name for the Latin Catholic titular see of Bida (North Africa)
 Bita, a Romanian village in the municipality of Reci, in Covasna County
 Bita (woreda), a region in Ethiopia

Other
 Bita (Persian), a female name